Rhaponticoides is a genus of flowering plants in the family Asteraceae, found in northern Africa, southern and eastern Europe, and western Asia as far east as Mongolia. They were resurrected from Centaurea.

In the 20th century the genus Centaurea was paraphyletic, because it was based on a type species, C. centaurium, which was less related to the vast majority of other Centaurea than to species which were classified as belonging to other genera. In 2001 Werner Greuter solved this by moving the C. centaurium and the related species in the former subgenus Centaurea to an old, resurrected genus: Rhaponticoides, he conserved the name Centaurea for the majority of the other species, and electing C. paniculata to serve as the new type species.

Species
Currently accepted species include:

Rhaponticoides africana (Lam.) M.V.Agab. & Greuter
Rhaponticoides alpina (L.) M.V.Agab. & Greuter
Rhaponticoides amasiensis (Bornm.) M.V.Agab. & Greuter
Rhaponticoides amplifolia (Boiss. & Heldr.) M.V.Agab. & Greuter
Rhaponticoides aytachii Bagci, Dogu & Dinç
Rhaponticoides bachtiarica (Boiss. & Hausskn.) L.Martins
Rhaponticoides calabrica Puntillo & Peruzzi
Rhaponticoides centaurium (L.) M.V.Agab. & Greuter
Rhaponticoides dschungarica (C.Shih) L.Martins
Rhaponticoides eriosiphon (Emb. & Maire) M.V.Agab. & Greuter
Rhaponticoides fraylensis (Nyman) M.V.Agab. & Greuter
Rhaponticoides gokceoglui Çinbilgel, Eren & H.Duman
Rhaponticoides hajastana (Tzvelev) M.V.Agab. & Greuter
Rhaponticoides hierroi Eren
Rhaponticoides iconiensis (Hub.-Mor.) M.V.Agab. & Greuter
Rhaponticoides kasakorum (Iljin) M.V.Agab. & Greuter
Rhaponticoides linaresii (Lázaro Ibiza) M.V.Agab. & Greuter
Rhaponticoides mykalea (Hub.-Mor.) M.V.Agab. & Greuter
Rhaponticoides pythiae (Azn. & Bornm.) M.V.Agab. & Greuter
Rhaponticoides razdorskyi (Karjagin ex Sosn.) M.V.Agab. & Greuter
Rhaponticoides ruthenica (Lam.) M.V.Agab. & Greuter
Rhaponticoides taliewii (Kleopow) M.V.Agab. & Greuter
Rhaponticoides tamanianae (M.V.Agab.) M.V.Agab. & Greuter
Rhaponticoides wagenitziana (Bancheva & Kit Tan) M.V.Agab. & Greuter

References

Cynareae
Asteraceae genera